AAUSAT-II (Aalborg University CubeSat no 2), is the second student-built CubeSat built and operated by students from Aalborg University in Denmark. It was launched 28 April 2008 05:53:51 UTC from Satish Dhawan Space Centre in India on a Polar Satellite Launch Vehicle (PSLV) launch vehicle. AAUSAT-II carries a gamma radiation sensor.

Educational objective 
The primary purpose of construction of satellites at the University of Aalborg is to give the students engineering capabilities beyond what is normally achieved within a masters program.

History 
Student satellite activities at Aalborg University (AAU) started in 2003 as a result of AAU's involvement in the first pure Danish research satellite, Ørsted, which was successfully launched in 1999. AAUSAT-II's predecessor was AAU CubeSat which was constructed in the period 2001-2003 and was launched 30 June 2003. The project started in the summer 2003. The construction of AAUSAT-II began in 2005.

Operations 
After the launch on 28 April 2008, AAUSat-2 beacon was received at Cal Poly University in California but two-way amateur radio communications could not be achieved as it turned out that AAUSat-2 was transmitting at a lower level than anticipated. After upgrades to the ground station were completed, fully functional two-way communication were achieved and continued with normal operations until May 2009 after a year of successful operation.

The ground station has remained in operation and beacons are received on a regular basis and AAUSat-2 is still considered operational - although heavy tumbling is observed (December 2009). Beacons are still received on regular basis in March 2011. In addition, AAUSat-2 does receive and acknowledge commands from ground and log files has been requested and received. Due to the very high tumbling (more than 2.5 Hz) it has not been possible to decode log files.

Below is a snapshot of the radio communication. On left side is a beacon, next a request for log is issued and AAUSat-2 reply with a transmission of the logfile. Notice the high tumbling rate.

In March 2012, the AAUSAT-II mission was officially retired by the project — but the CubeSat is still up and running.

Mission definition 
AAUSAT-II consists of several sub-systems:

 ADCS: Attitude Determination and Control System
 CDH: Command and Datahandling System
 COM: Communication System
 EPS: Electrical Power System
 GND: Ground Station
 MCC: Mission Control Center
 MECH: Mechanical System
 OBC: On-board Computer System
 P/L: Payload System

Technical Facts:

Amateur radio information 
 Callsign: OZ2CUB
 Up/downlink: 437.425 MHz AFSK & FSK
 Bit rate: 1200-9600 bit/s (1200 as standard mode)
 AX.25 FM CW TLM

See also 

 List of CubeSats

References

External links 
 Official historic homepage
 Launch campaign homepage

Student satellites
Aalborg University
Spacecraft launched in 2008
CubeSats